Paul William Tierney (1919–1973)  was an Australian rugby league footballer in the New South Wales Rugby Football League premiership.

Playing career
An Australian former serviceman, Tierney played over 60 matches for the Eastern Suburbs club in the years (1943–49). A , Tierney was a member of the Eastern Suburbs side that defeated Balmain in the 1945 premiership decider.

Death
Tierney died in 1973.

References

 The Encyclopedia Of Rugby League players; Alan Whiticker & Glen Hudson

Australian rugby league players
Sydney Roosters players
1973 deaths
1919 births
Place of birth missing
Place of death missing
Rugby league centres